The International Association of Culinary Professionals (IACP) is a United States-based not-for-profit professional association whose members work in culinary education, communication, or the preparation of food and beverage.

History
The organization was formed in 1978, as Association of Cooking Schools (ACS), and incorporated in 1979.  The name changed to International Association of Cooking Schools (IACS) in 1981. By 1987 the association had expanded its reach to include international members and renamed itself the “International Association of Cooking Professionals."  In 1990, the association merged with the “Food Marketing Communicators” organization and again changed its name, to the “International Association of Culinary Professionals.”

Since 1990, the association sponsored conferences in New Orleans, Philadelphia, Chicago, Portland, Providence, Baltimore, Dallas, and Seattle.

In 2018, Tanya Steel, a food journalist, healthy foods advocate, and creator of the Healthy Lunchtime Challenge & Kids' State Dinner with former First Lady Michelle Obama, a five year-initiative at the White House was named chief executive officer.

IACP Awards
The IACP Cookbook Awards are presented annually to honor excellence in cookbook writing and publishing. They were previously called "Tastemaker's" awards. These include awards named for Julia Child, for a writer's first cookbook, and a Jane Grigson Award for distinguished scholarship.

The IACP also presents the Bert Greene Awards for food journalism, in magazine, internet, and newspaper categories. 

The IACP also gives out awards for food photography and digital media.

References

External links
IACP official site
Awards presented by the organization

Culinary professional associations
1978 establishments in the United States